Corey Michael Potter (born January 5, 1984) is an American former professional ice hockey defenseman. He most recently played for Kölner Haie of the Deutsche Eishockey Liga (DEL). Potter was born in Lansing, Michigan, but grew up in Mason, Michigan.

Playing career
As a youth, Potter played in the 1998 Quebec International Pee-Wee Hockey Tournament with the Detroit Honeybaked minor ice hockey team.

Potter was drafted 122nd overall in the 2003 NHL Entry Draft by the New York Rangers. He played his first NHL game for the Rangers on December 7, 2008 against the Calgary Flames. He scored his first NHL point, an assist on a Dmitri Kalinin goal, on December 27, 2008 against the New Jersey Devils. He scored his first NHL goal on April 2, 2009 against the Carolina Hurricanes.

He was signed as a free agent by the Pittsburgh Penguins on July 16, 2010.

On July 1, 2011, Potter signed a one-year, two-way contract with the Edmonton Oilers. His signing was in part due to the urging of Oilers coach Tom Renney. After appearing in only one NHL game with the Penguins the previous year, he made the club out of training camp. He has played a large role, including being featured on the first unit power-play.

On January 9, 2012, Potter signed a two-year extension with the Oilers In his 62nd game after Potter was hit by Bobby Ryan of the Anaheim Ducks, he suffered a concussion, and missed the remainder of the regular season.

On October 2, 2012 he signed a temporary NHL lockout contract with the Vienna Capitals of the Austrian Hockey League. Potter appeared in 17 games for 4 points before returning to the Oilers for the shortened 2012–13 season.

On the eve of the 2013–14 trade deadline, on March 4, 2014 Potter was placed on waivers by the Oilers and later claimed by the Boston Bruins.

In the off-season, Potter agreed to a one-year, two way contract with the Calgary Flames for the 2014–15 season on September 5, 2014.

As a free agent, Potter accepted a professional try-out contract to attend the training camp of the Arizona Coyotes on September 9, 2015. The Coyotes signed Potter to a one-year, two-way deal on October 2. In the 2015–16 season, Potter was reassigned to the Springfield Falcons. As an alternate captain Potter appeared in 52 games with the Falcons for 17 points. On February 29, 2016, Potter was dealt at the trade deadline to the Nashville Predators for future considerations.

On May 27, 2016, Potter opted to embark on his second venture in Europe in agreeing to a one-year contract in Germany, with Kölner Haie of the Deutsche Eishockey Liga (DEL).

Career statistics

Regular season and playoffs

International

References

External links

1984 births
Living people
Adirondack Flames players
American men's ice hockey defensemen
Boston Bruins players
Calgary Flames players
Charlotte Checkers (1993–2010) players
Edmonton Oilers players
Hartford Wolf Pack players
Ice hockey players from Michigan
Kölner Haie players
Michigan State Spartans men's ice hockey players
Milwaukee Admirals players
Nashville Predators players
New York Rangers draft picks
New York Rangers players
Oklahoma City Barons players
People from Mason, Michigan
Pittsburgh Penguins players
Sportspeople from Lansing, Michigan
Springfield Falcons players
Vienna Capitals players
Wilkes-Barre/Scranton Penguins players